Orlando City U-23 was an American soccer team based in Lake Mary, Florida, United States. Founded in 1998, the team played in the Premier Development League (PDL), the fourth tier of the American Soccer Pyramid, in the Southeast Division of the Southern Conference. The team was part of the Orlando City SC youth development system, and played the majority of their home games at Seminole Soccer Complex in nearby Lake Mary, Florida.

The team's colors as the Kraze were blue, white and red, while they also occasionally wore forest green.

History

The team was known as the Central Florida Lionhearts during their first year of existence. From 1999 to 2011, it was known as the Central Florida Kraze.

On November 30, 2011, Orlando City Soccer Club announced that it has purchased controlling interest in the Kraze, and would rename the club Orlando City U-23. The team also acquired a different youth club, Florida Soccer Alliance, and integrated them as Orlando City Youth Soccer to create a European-style development system.

Players

Current roster
As of August 10, 2015

Notable former players
This list of notable former players comprises players who went on to play professional soccer after playing for the team in the Premier Development League, or those who previously played professionally before joining the team.

  Lyle Adams
  Nick Regan
  Tyler Blackwood
  Dennis Chin
  Dominic Cianciarulo
  Gonzalo De Mujica
  Jon Gruenewald
  Aly Hassan
  Adama Mbengue
  Ryan McIntosh
  Jonathan Mendoza
  Sergei Raad
  Keith Savage
  Tony Taylor
  Eric Vasquez
  Tanner Wolfe
  Graham Zusi

Year-by-year

Honors
 USL PDL Southern Conference Champions 2012
 USL PDL Southeast Division Champions 2008
 USL PDL Champions 2004
 USL PDL Southern Conference Champions 2004
 USL PDL Southeast Division Champions 2004

Head coaches
  Joe Avallone (1999–2012)
  Paul Shaw (2013–2015)

Stadium
 Stadium at Edgewater High School; Orlando, Florida (1999–2002)
 Stadium at Winter Springs High School; Winter Springs, Florida (2003)
 Showalter Field; Winter Park, Florida (2004–2006, 2010–2011)
 Central Winds Park; Winter Springs, Florida (2006) 2 matches
 Kraze and Krush Stadium; Lake Mary, Florida (2007–2009)
 Cahall-Sandspur Field at Rollins College; Winter Park, Florida (2011) 1 match
 Citrus Bowl; Orlando, Florida (2011) 2 matches
 Stadium at The Master's Academy; Oviedo, Florida (2011) 1 match
 Seminole Soccer Complex; Lake Mary, Florida (2012–)

Average attendance
Attendance stats are calculated by averaging each team's self-reported home attendances from the historical match archive at 

 2005: 308
 2006: 271
 2007: 451 (8th in PDL)
 2008: 358
 2009: 261
 2010: 333

References

External links
 Official page
 Official PDL page

 
Orlando City SC
Association football clubs established in 1998
USL League Two teams
Seminole County, Florida
Soccer clubs in Orlando, Florida
1998 establishments in Florida
2016 disestablishments in Florida
Association football clubs disestablished in 2016